Cobham services is a motorway service area on the M25 motorway in Surrey between junctions 9 and 10. It is operated by Extra MSA and was opened for business on 13 September 2012. Its planned opening date was scheduled to be early 2010, but was changed to early 2012 following various planning issues. The services were constructed as there was concern with the large 65 mile (104 km) gap without any service areas. At either end of that stretch of motorway was South Mimms services and Clacket Lane services, and the Secretary of State explained there was a clear and compelling need for a further service area. The other service area serving the motorway is Thurrock.

Cobham services is the busiest service station in the UK.

Planning
Proposals for a service station on the M25 at Cobham were first made in the early 1990s and the first public inquiry took place in 1996. Planning permission was granted in 2005. The service area is built on the site of a farm named 'New Barn Farm', and opened in September 2012.

The main concern about the service's construction was that the area was to be built on part of the green belt area for Cobham, However, as the whole of the M25 is situated within the green belt, the Secretary of State John Prescott overruled this objection as there was what he called a "clear and compelling need" to have a service station in the south west section of the M25.

There have been other concerns that the waste from thousands of visiting tourists could damage Downside's Victorian sewage system.

Layout

Unusually, one service area is provided for both traffic directions and it is all located to the south of the motorway. Access from the eastbound carriageway is via a tunnel underneath the M25. Access from the west-bound carriageway is from the motorway itself.

As with a number of modern service stations, many have an ecological aspect such as an sustainable drainage system, rain-harnessing or a renewable energy source. Cobham has been designed to include a sustainable drainage system that filters the water from silt and sand, cleans the water, and then naturally attenuates the water into local watercourses. Retention basins, Swales and infiltration trenches deal with excess water, storm water and most importantly flood risk. The infiltration trenches drain water using pebbles and small stones which naturally filter and store water, the remaining stored water is channeled out of the site. The retention basins collect water runoff, and the water outflow out of the basins is carefully controlled, the lakes have water piped to infiltration trenches. Even though these basins are designed to collect water and drain water in a more controlled way, some water escapes and seeps (infiltrates) into the ground. Depending on the season the water level in all of these trenches and basins change dramatically. The infiltration trenches then flow into local watercourses. The swales (marsh areas) are less complex and drain water directly into the ground, they are surrounded by vegetation. Just like infiltration trenches, swales also attenuate, filter and clean water. Vegetation which is around the service area and its drainage system, helps to absorb harmful substances to the environment and clean water in the infiltration trenches, swales, retention basins and around the site.

Construction
Work on the site started in Autumn 2010 and construction eventually started in mid-2011 on the slip roads and tunnel for the service area. The speed limit was reduced to 50 mph, and a temporary carriageway was set up, diverting traffic past the construction site and back onto the motorway. The 50 mph speed limit took place on a short section of the westbound carriageway, where construction traffic was accessing the site. Extra MSA founded their own construction company called 'Swayfields' immediately when Extra MSA was created in 2000, so they could construct service areas themselves. Cobham was constructed by Swayfields from 2011–2012, and all of Extra MSA's.

On 10 August 2012 an opening date of 8 September 2012 was announced, later than expected due to poor weather delaying the final phases of construction. Further delays caused the opening to slip to 13 September 2012.

References

External links

Official website
Extra MSA company website
Motorway Services Online

Buildings and structures in Surrey
Borough of Elmbridge
Extra motorway service stations
M25 motorway service stations